Callopistria bernei is a moth of the family Noctuidae. This species can be found on Réunion.

References

 Viette, 1985a. Sur deux espèces de Callopistria de l'île de la Réunion, dont une nouvelle (Lepidoptera Noctuidae Amphipyrinae). - Lambillionea 84(1–4):15–16.

Caradrinini
Moths described in 1985
Moths of Réunion
Endemic fauna of Réunion